The R618 is a Regional Route in South Africa that connects Hlobane with St Lucia via Nongoma and Mtubatuba.

Route
Its north-western terminus is the R69 at Hlobane, a village between Vryheid and Louwsburg. It heads east-southeast to Nongoma, where it meets the R66, with which it is briefly co-signed, heading south. Leaving the R66, it heads east, then veers south, before traversing the Umfolozi Game Reserve in a southeasterly direction. It reaches the N2 at Mtubatuba. It is co-signed with the N2 briefly to the south, before heading east to the Greater St. Lucia Wetland Park.

References

Regional Routes in KwaZulu-Natal